Days of Wonder — Live 1976 is a live album by the English rock band Magnum. It was released in 2000 by Zoom Club.

This album was recorded at The Railway Inn in Birmingham in 1976. It represents one of the first shows by Magnum, with original material, much of which was not released until Kingdom Of Madness in 1978 and Magnum II in 1979. Although most of their first album, Kingdom Of Madness, was finished, it was not released until 1978. Magnum performed a regular set at The Railway Inn, so there is no accurate date for when this recording was made.

Originally, Tony Clarkin hesitated to authorise this release of this recording, as Magnum's back catalogue had already been reissued, along with many unofficial compilations without the band's authorisation. CD inlay notes say that one of Clarkin's friends found the early recording in his loft. The recording was made by Andrew Hayes on a Studer Revox tape recorder.

Track listing

Personnel
Tony Clarkin — guitar
Bob Catley — vocals
Wally Lowe — bass
Richard Bailey — keyboards, flute
Kex Gorin — drums

References

External links
 www.magnumonline.co.uk — Official Magnum site

Albums produced by Tony Clarkin
Magnum (band) live albums
1976 live albums